Basselinia humboldtiana is a species of flowering plant in the family Arecaceae. It is found only in New Caledonia.

References

humboldtiana
Endemic flora of New Caledonia
Conservation dependent plants
Taxonomy articles created by Polbot
Taxa named by Adolphe-Théodore Brongniart
Taxa named by Harold E. Moore